The Communauté de communes du canton de Montdidier  is a former communauté de communes in the Somme département and in the  Picardie région of France. It was created in December 2000. It was merged into the Communauté de communes du Grand Roye in January 2017.

Composition 
This Communauté de communes comprised 34 communes:

Andechy
Assainvillers
Ayencourt
Becquigny
Bouillancourt-la-Bataille
Boussicourt
Bus-la-Mésière
Cantigny
Le Cardonnois
Courtemanche
Davenescourt
Erches
Ételfay
Faverolles
Fescamps
Fignières
Fontaine-sous-Montdidier
Gratibus
Grivillers
Guerbigny
Hargicourt
Laboissière-en-Santerre
Lignières
Malpart
Marestmontiers
Marquivillers
Mesnil-Saint-Georges
Montdidier
Piennes-Onvillers
Remaugies
Rollot
Rubescourt
Villers-Tournelle
Warsy

See also 
Communes of the Somme department

References

Montdidier